Giorgio Hesdey Tuinfort is a Dutch record producer and songwriter.

Biography
Born in Suriname, Tuinfort moved to the Netherlands at 9 months old. His musical career started at age 4, after he attended a special music class for toddlers. After being touted a ‘musical promise’ he was admitted to the Young Talent Class of the Royal Conservatory of The Hague at the tender age of 11. Here Giorgio studied Classical music, with his major instrument being the piano.

Giorgio’s production and composition abilities were first discovered at the age of 16 by Rutger “Rutti” Kroese, who gave him the platform to work with well-established Dutch artists such as Re-Play, Brace, Ebon-E, Negativ and Lange Frans & Baas B. Giorgio swiftly became a highly sought-after name in the industry.
Subsequently, Tuinfort embarked on an international career and moved to the United States to work with then upcoming Senegalese American recording artist Akon. They achieved great success with several hits such as “Right Now (Na, Na, Na)”, “Beautiful”, “What U Got”.

In the years following he collaborated with many musicians, including Gwen Stefani, Michael Jackson, Sia, Rihanna, Lady Gaga, Whitney Houston and Lionel Richie among many others.

2009 saw the start of his collaboration with David Guetta, turning the radio pop culture on its head by combining EDM with pop and urban music. This resulted in various songs during that time such as “Who's That Chick?” with Rihanna, “One Last Time” with Ariana Grande and “Titanium” with Sia. As of today, the duo still creates music together.

Giorgio continued to show his musical diversity when he composed all music and television themes for the UEFA 2016 European Football Championships. Aside from the title song with David Guetta, Giorgio also composed classical renditions which were recorded by the 130-piece Netherlands Philharmonic Orchestra and received international praise.

Tuinfort, together with Franck van der Heijden, is the composer of the UEFA Nations League theme song, which was lauded by critics as one of the best contemporary classical pieces of modern time. 
Giorgio once again composed all music for the UEFA Euro 2020 including the official song of the tournament ‘We Are the People’ together with Martin Garrix, Bono and The Edge.

In the interim Giorgio has showed his intercontinental abilities with successes on both Japanese and Indian soil. He co-produced ‘Scarlet’ for the Japanese group J Soul Brothers II, which became a major success and reached the number one position on the Japanese charts.
In India he co-produced “Chammak Challo” for the Bollywood film Ra.One. The song was named the most downloaded song and video of the year when released, winning a Merchi “Song of the Year” Award. 

When asked, Giorgio still mentions Classical Music as the "Love of his Life" and expresses his ambitions to release his own music in 2023.

Production and songwriting
Giorgio has written- and produced for the world most renowned artists, amongst them Akon, David Guetta, Michael Jackson, Black Eyed Peas, Gwen Stefani, Rihanna, Sia, Lady Gaga, Martin Garrix, Ariana Grande, Céline Dion, Charlie Puth, Britney Spears, Whitney Houston, Usher, Lionel Richie and Sean Paul.

Awards
Giorgio was nominated for a Grammy Award four times, winning twice. He won the prestigious BMI Songwriter Award an unprecedented 30 times. He is recipient of the Buma Export Award (an award given to Dutch composers who have sold the most records abroad). He was also awarded the Golden Harp (Dutch music accomplishment award) and a Gouden Kalf (Dutch equivalent of the Oscars) for his music score for the Dutch film Bolletjes Blues.
In 2015, Giorgio was commended by the Dutch Royal Family as recognition to his achievements and contribution to Dutch music on an international scale.

Giorgio is a Spotify Secret Genius

StemDrop
Tuinfort is part of the trio which created StemDrop, a new evolution in global music collaboration. StemDrop launches a song with one of the greatest songwriters online via TikTok. TikTok creators globally are exclusively provided with music stems and invited to produce their own versions of the brand-new song. StemDrop is a collaboration between Syco Entertainment, Universal Music Group and Republic Records.

Drop #001 was launched on October 19th, 2022. It is the song “Red Light”, written by the hit-making team Max Martin, Savan Kotecha and Ali Payami.

Personal life
Giorgio is known for avoiding the limelight and not being present on social media, citing "Music should speak for itself".

Songwriting and Production Credits

Dutch selected Music Discography

Bolletjes Blues – Welkom in ons leven featuring Derenzo, Kimo, Mr Probz, Negativ, Raymzter

Brace – Cupido

Brace – Dilemma

Brace – Dit ben ik featuring Brainpower

Brace – Drijfzand

Brace – Hartendief featuring Ali B

Brace – Les Geleerd featuring Lange Frans

Brace – Samen

Brace – Van Jongen naar Man

Brace – Vraag Jezelf eens Af

Dignity – Everything Has Changed (Piano Version)

E-Life – K.I.T.A

Ebon-E – On My Way

Excellent – Doe Rustig

Gio – Je Hebt me

Goldy – Goldy

Gordon – I'll be your Voice (Songfestival 2003)

Gordon & Re-Play – Een Nieuw Begin featuring Extince

Gordon & Re-Play – Vrienden voor het Leven

Kinderen voor Kinderen – 100 Jaar

Kinderen voor Kinderen – Als de Wereld nou van Mij is

Kinderen voor Kinderen – Dierenvriend

Kinderen voor Kinderen – Leef met Elkaar

Kinderen voor Kinderen – Ons Hele Leven Lang

Kinderen voor Kinderen – Wereldplan

Lange Frans – Doofpot

Lange Frans – Testament

Lange Frans – Zing voor me featuring Thé Lau

Lange Frans & Baas B – Dankbaar featuring Suzanna Lubrano

Lange Frans & Baas B – Geef me nog een Kans featuring Brace

Lange Frans & Baas B – Kamervragen

Lange Frans & Baas B – Neem me niet Kwalijk

Lange Frans & Baas B – Het Land van

Lange Frans & Baas B – Venus en Mars

Lange Frans & Baas B – Verder

Mark Dakriet – De Reis

Mark Dakriet – Dit Lied is Voor Jou

Mark Dakriet – Droom Maar

Mark Dakriet – Een Laatste Dans

Mark Dakriet – Er is een Weg

Mark Dakriet – Je Moeten Missen

Mark Dakriet – Muziek

Mark Dakriet – Nooit Meer Alleen

Mark Dakriet – Nu het Over is met Ruth Jacott

Mark Dakriet – Samen Sterk met Lady Smith Black Mambazo

Mark Dakriet – Tegen Beter Weten in

Mark Dakriet – Voor Altijd

Mark Dakriet – Vrij Zijn

Mark Dakriet – Waardeloos met Suzanna Lubrano

Mark Dakriet – We Komen er wel Uit

Negativ – Dingen Gedaan

Negativ – Je Weet niet wie ik Ben

Negativ – Kijk Eens om je Heen

Negativ – Negativitijdperk

Negativ – Niks is wat het Zijn moet featuring Ebon-E

Negativ – Onbreekbaar

Raymzter – Soms Gaat het Mis

Re-Play – Die Tijd

Re-Play – Hum Hum

Re-Play – Niemand

Re-Play – Piraterij

Re-Play – Schaakmat

Re-Play – Ware Liefde

Sat-R-Day – My Girl's Best Friend

Trijntje Oosterhuis – We are Gold

References 

1981 births
Living people
Dutch composers
People from Paramaribo